Nosferatu pratinus (previously placed in the genus Herichthys), also known as green labridens or mojarra caracolera verde in Spanish, is a species of cichlid "endemic to the Rio el Salto,in the Rio Pánuco Basin in Mexico. The river runs through the Sierra La Colmena, where a series of pools and cascades called “Micos” occur. The area includes seven cascades with heights of five meters or more. Up the river is a town called El Naranjo, which is 102 km north from Ciudad Valles at the border between the States of Tamaulipas and San Luis Potosí. Two kilometers upstream from El Naranjo exists a series of pools and cascades, such as El Salto and El Meco, which are 70-m and 35-m high, respectively; both sites are inhabited by H. pratinus."

"This species is distinguished by predorsal contour steep and flat, and a concavity before eye; prominent forehead that develops a nuchal hump in adult males. Dorsal and ventral contours are conic, straight to moderately convex, making intersection with caudal peduncle conspicuous. Also distinguished using the following combination characters: distance from anal fin origin to hypural base (mean 36%, SD 1%). Mouth slightly angled downward. Lower pharyngeal plate moderately stout and broad; 2 rows of 8–9 stout molars increasing in size posteriorly and molarization flank the midline, 4 most posterior molars flattened. Spiny dorsal fin rays V."

"In live, basic color olive green with tiny speckles on snout and head, particularly along the dorsal region. Speckles do not extend beyond the line between the edge of lips and the ventral edge of the orbit. All have a red marking in the axil behind the pectoral fin. Dorsal, caudal, and anal fin tips are brick red that extends onto the margin of the soft section. Random dark blotches, dots, or patterns circumscribed 6 vertical partial bands may or may not be present."

Phylogenetic relationships
Although similar in appearance to N. pantostictus; mitochondrial gene COX-1 analysis by De la Maza-Benignos, et al. (2015) confirmed that N. pratinus is actually more closely related to species N. steindachneri and N. pame than to N. pantostictus. Moreover, while N. steindachneri is sympatric to N. pame, N. pratinus is allopatric to all of the aforementioned species. Nosferatu pratinus, N. pame and N. steindachneri conform the Steindachneri clade.

References

pratinus
Cichlid fish of Central America
Fish described in 2013
Taxa named by Mauricio De la Maza-Benignos
Taxa named by María de Lourdes Lozano-Vilano